Eric Warden  (born 13 December 1992) is a Ghanaian footballer who most recently played for Luftëtari Gjirokastër FC.

References

External links

1992 births
Living people
Association football midfielders
Ghanaian footballers
Segunda División B players
Tercera División players
Super League Greece players
Kategoria Superiore players
RC Celta de Vigo players
Fokikos A.C. players
Levadiakos F.C. players
Iraklis Psachna F.C. players
Olympiacos Volos F.C. players
OFI Crete F.C. players
Kallithea F.C. players
A.E. Sparta P.A.E. players
Luftëtari Gjirokastër players
Ghanaian expatriate footballers
Expatriate footballers in Spain
Ghanaian expatriate sportspeople in Spain
Expatriate footballers in Greece
Ghanaian expatriate sportspeople in Greece
Expatriate footballers in Albania
Ghanaian expatriate sportspeople in Albania